The Minister of Women, Family and Community Development is Nancy Shukri, since 3 December 2022. The Minister administers the portfolio through the Minister of Women, Family and Community Development.

List of ministers of women and family
The following individuals have been appointed as Minister of Women, or any of its precedent titles:

Political Party:

List of ministers of community
The following individuals have been appointed as Minister of Community, or any of its precedent titles:

Political Party:

List of ministers of social welfare
The following individuals have been appointed as Minister of Welfare, or any of its precedent titles:

Political Party:

References

Ministry of Women, Family and Community Development (Malaysia)
Lists of government ministers of Malaysia
Malaysia
Malaysia